Combined Mixed Team Event was the main event of cycling at the 2010 Summer Youth Olympics program.  Each team consisted of three boys and one girl.  There were seven sub-events where cyclists competed with other teams in order to earn points; the team with the lowest points after the seven sub-events was declared the winner.  Each boy raced in one of Cross Country, Time Trial and BMX while the girl competed in all three events, all three boys also raced in the Road Race.  The event was held over the period of four days from 17 to 19 and 22 August 2010.  The venues were at Tampines Bike Park for the Cross Country, Boys’ Time Trial and BMX and The Float at Marina Bay for Girls’ Time Trial and the Road Race.

Medalists

Results

References 

 Results of Each Discipline
 Final Day with Top 10

Cycling at the 2010 Summer Youth Olympics
2010 in road cycling
2010 in track cycling
2010 in BMX
2010 in mountain biking